Richard Granger (born c.1965) is a British management consultant and former UK civil servant who was Director General for the NHS's information technology project, Connecting for Health.

Early career 

Granger worked for Andersen Consulting (now Accenture) and in the oil industry. After Andersen he became a partner at Deloitte Consulting. At Deloitte he was responsible for procurement and delivery of a number of large scale IT programmes, including the Congestion Charging Scheme for London.

NHS 
In 2002 Granger was appointed Director General of Information at the National Health Service, with responsibility for the NHS IT centralisation scheme, NPfIT (National Programme for IT), later rebadged as NHS Connecting for Health or CfH.

He announced his resignation in June 2007, saying that he planned to return to the private sector. He transitioned out of the role and left CfH in February 2008. Granger was recognised with a number of awards for his work in the NHS.  These included an honorary doctorate in Public Health from Cass Business School, London, Chartered IT Professional status and advancement to Fellowship of the British Computer Society. Granger was a member of the Advisory Panel for the production of the ITGI's COBIT 4.1 IT Governance Guide. On 26 April 2006 Granger was featured extensively in the BBC Programme 'Modern Brunels' regarding the Public Health benefits of more accessible information in the Health sector. Many spoke highly of Granger following his announcement that he intended to return to the private sector, whilst others were critical of his management of the project.

KPMG 
After departing the NHS he joined KPMG as a partner in 2008.

References 

Living people
Accenture people
Alumni of the University of Bristol
British businesspeople
British management consultants
Year of birth missing (living people)